Semarang is a landlocked regency in Central Java province in Indonesia. It covers an area of 950.207 km2 and had a population of 930,727 at the 2010 census, 999,817 at the 2015 census and 1,053,094 at the 2020 census. These figures exclude the independent cities of Semarang and Salatiga, which are administratively separate from the regency. The regency's capital is Ungaran, which lies immediately to the south of Semarang City.

Geography
Administratively, Semarang Regency borders Kendal Regency and Temanggung Regency in the west, Boyolali Regency and Magelang Regency in the south, Grobogan Regency and Demak Regency in the east, and the city of Semarang in the north. Salatiga City, meanwhile, forms an enclave within the regency, and is administratively separate.

Air temperature in this regency is relatively cold because it is located between 318 and 1,450 m above sea level. Ungaran Barat District is the lowest area, while Getasan District is the highest. In 2005 there was 97 rainy days and in 2007 was 83 rainy days. Bawen District is an area with the most rainy days (144 days) and Suruh District the least (30 days).

Demographics 
Semarang Regency had a population of 1,053,094 in 2020, an increase of 53,277 since the 2015 census. The gender ratio in 2020 is 99.44 (males per 100 females).

Administrative divisions
Semarang Regency comprises nineteen districts (kecamatan), listed below with their areas and their populations at the 2010 Cemsus and the 2020 census. The districts are sub-divided into 208 rural villages or desa, and 27 urban villages or kelurahan.

Tourist attractions
Budha Gaya Watugong Shrine. Budha Gaya Watugong shrine complex has great artistic value. With the height of 39 metres, it represents the highest pagoda in Indonesia. It was built in 2005, and it is located in front of Makodam IV Diponegoro Semarang. In the seven-floor building, there are some  Goddess statues lied on its second until sixth floor, and also has 20 Kwan Im statues.
The Indonesian Railway Museum is located on the town of Ambarawa. The museum is located on a decommissioned railway station and houses several train locomotives, carriages, and railway paraphernalia from the colonial era.
The Gedong Songo Temple Complex are a series of temples located some 5 kilometers from the town of Bandungan, on the slopes of Mount Ungaran built in the Hindu-Buddhist era.
Penggaron Forest. This forest recreation site lies within 17 km from Semarang and only 2 km from Ungaran, making the area very close to urban areas. It is dominated by pine trees, though other species can also be found.
Lake Rawa Pening is a freshwater lake located in the districts of Ambarawa, Banyubiru, Bawen, and Tuntang. It is home to a unique ecosystem made out of floating water hyacinth islands and is an important center of fisheries and birdlife in the regency.
Tlogo Coffee Plantation. Tlogo Coffee Plantation is located in Delik Village. Cold weather and clean air, free from pollution,  will bring enjoyable moment and beautiful panorama.

Footnotes

External links

  Official website